Trinia is a genus of flowering plant in the family Apiaceae, native from Europe to Iran and western Siberia. The genus was first described by Georg Franz Hoffmann in 1814.

Species
, Plants of the World Online accepted the following species:
Trinia biebersteinii Fedor.
Trinia castroviejoi Gómez Nav., Roselló, E.Laguna, P.P.Ferrer, Peris, A.Guillén,
Trinia crithmifolia (Willd.) H.Wolff
Trinia dalechampii (Ten.) Janch.
Trinia esteparia Uribe-Ech.
Trinia frigida (Boiss. & Heldr.) Drude
Trinia glauca (L.) Dumort.
Trinia guicciardii (Boiss. & Heldr.) Drude
Trinia hispida Hoffm.
Trinia kitaibelii M.Bieb.
Trinia leiogona (C.A.Mey.) B.Fedtsch.
Trinia multicaulis (Poir.) Schischk.
Trinia muricata Godet

References

Apioideae
Apioideae genera